This is a list of Saudi Arabian writers, including novelists, short story writers, poets, journalists, bloggers, etc. 

 Thuraya Qabil writer and poet (1943 - )
 Aaidh ibn Abdullah al-Qarni
 Abdo Khal (1962-)
 Abdul Rahman Munif
 Abdullah Bin Bakheet
 Abdullah Thabit
 Ali al-Ahmed
 Eman al-Nafjan
 Fawziyya Abu Khalid
 Ghazi Abdul Rahman Algosaibi
 Hamza Muhammad Bogary
 Hamza Shihata (1910–71)
 Weam Al Dakheel, journalist, television presenter
 Ibrahim Al-Hsawi
 Laila al-Juhani (1969-)
 Laila al-Ohaidib
 Mai Yamani
 Mansour Alnogaidan
 Maqbul Moussa al-Alawi
 Mohammed Hasan Alwan
 Mohammed Suroor Sabban
 Mutlaq Hamid Al-Otaibi
 Raif Badawi
 Raja'a Alem
 Rajaa al-Sanea
 Rashid Al Shamrani
 Rashid Al Zlami
 Reem al Faisal
 Samira Khashoggi
 Siba'i Uthman
 Turki al-Hamad
 Umaima al-Khamis (1966-)
 Yahya Amqassim
 Yousef Al-Mohaimeed
 Zuhair Kutbi
 Hadeel Alhodaif
 Nimah Ismail Nawwab
 Rajaa al-Sanea

References 

Saudi Arabian
Saudi Arabian literature